Jani Macari Pallis is the founder and CEO of Cislunar Aerodynamics in San Francisco, California. She is also an associate professor of mechanical engineering at the University of Bridgeport in Bridgeport, Connecticut. Her areas of expertise are aerodynamics, biomedical engineering, and Sports science.

Pallis is believed to be the first mechanical engineer to examine the Wright Brothers artifacts at the Franklin Institute.

Pallis wrote a monthly column, "Tennis SET," at The Tennis Server. The column featured tennis science, engineering, and technology.

Education
 Bachelor's and master's degrees from Georgia Institute of Technology, where she was a member of the women's fraternity Alpha Gamma Delta
 Master's degree in mechanical engineering from University of California, Berkeley
 PhD in mechanical and aeronautical engineering from University of California, Davis

Publications
Hung and Pallis, Biomedical Engineering Principles in Sports

Pallis, the big book of air and space flight activities

References

Georgia Tech alumni
University of California, Davis alumni
UC Berkeley College of Engineering alumni
University of Bridgeport faculty
American women engineers
American women chief executives
American chief executives
Living people
21st-century women engineers
Year of birth missing (living people)
American women academics
21st-century American women